

The Murphy SR2500 Super Rebel is a Canadian four-seat monoplane designed by Murphy Aircraft of British Columbia. The type was sold as a kit for home construction, but production ended by 2008.

Design and development
Designed as a larger four-seat version of the Rebel, the Super Rebel is an all-metal high-wing braced monoplane with two rows of side-by-side seats for four. The prototype first flew in November 1995 and was powered by a  Lycoming O-540-4A5 driving a two-bladed constant-speed propeller. The prototype had a tricycle landing gear but the standard model (SR2500TD) has a tailwheel landing gear. The rear bench seat can be removed to hold luggage and the Super Rebel has a separate baggage door on the port side behind the passenger door. The aircraft is designed for any engine between 134 and 186 kW (180 to 250 hp) and also has larger fuel tanks as an option (increasing range to 1350 km (839 miles).

Variants
SR2500 Super Rebel
Powered by a  Lycoming O-540-4A5, tricycle undercarriage.
SR2500TD Super Rebel;
As for the SR2500 with taildragger undercarriage
SR3500 Super Rebel
Powered by a  Vedeneyev M14P

Specifications (with O-540 engine)

References
Notes

Bibliography

 

1990s Canadian civil utility aircraft
Homebuilt aircraft
High-wing aircraft
Aircraft first flown in 1995
Single-engined tractor aircraft
Super Rebel